Holy Cross is an unincorporated community located in the town of Belgium in Ozaukee County, Wisconsin, United States. Holy Cross is located just east of Fredonia and southwest of Belgium.

Holy Cross, like nearby Dacada, was settled by immigrants from Luxembourg in the 1840s and 1850s.  The name for the community comes from the former Catholic parish of Holy Cross, which was formed in the area in 1845.

References

Luxembourgian-American culture in Wisconsin
Unincorporated communities in Ozaukee County, Wisconsin
Unincorporated communities in Wisconsin